The 2020–21 Oral Roberts Golden Eagles women's basketball represent Oral Roberts University in the 2020–21 NCAA Division I women's basketball season. The Golden Eagles, led by ninth year head coach Misti Cussen, compete in the Summit League. They play home games in Mabee Center in Tulsa, Oklahoma.

Previous season
The Golden Eagles went 15–16 overall and 9–7 in conference play, finishing third.

Oral Roberts won the quarterfinals against no. 5 seed Western Illinois 74–66, and at the semifinal lost against no. 1 seed South Dakota 43–65.

Offseason

Departures

Additions

2020 recruiting class

Preseason

Summit League Preseason poll
The Summit League Preseason poll and other preseason awards was released on October 26, 2020 with the Golden Eagles selected to finish in fourth place in the Summit League.

Preseason All-Summit teams
The Golden Eagles had one player selected to the preseason all-Summit teams.

First team

Keni Jo Lippe

Roster

Schedule

|-
!colspan=12 style=|Non-conference regular season

|-
!colspan=12 style=| Summit League regular season

|-
!colspan=12 style=| Summit League Women's Tournament

Source:

References

Oral Roberts Golden Eagles women's basketball seasons
2020–21 Summit League women's basketball season
Oral Roberts
Oral Roberts